The Martinikerk (Martin's church) is the oldest church in Groningen, Netherlands. The church and its associated tower (the Martinitoren) are named after Saint Martin of Tours (316–397), the patron saint of the Bishopric of Utrecht to which Groningen belonged.

The church was a cathedral for a short period during the first bishopric of Groningen (1559–1594).

The origins of the Martinikerk are a cruciform church built in the 13th century, which was extended in the 15th and 16th centuries. It contains several 16th-century tombs and Wessel Gansfort's 18th-century tomb. Much of the wall and roof paintwork has been preserved. Of particular note is a 16th-century depiction of the life of Jesus Christ.

The tower was built from 1469 till 1482, with later additions. Citizens of Groningen often refer to the tower as d'Olle Grieze (the Old Grey One). The original 13th-century tower was destroyed by lightning, and a new tower was built in the 15th century, also destroyed by lightning.

Its organ contains stops dating back to 1450, and was rebuilt and enlarged by Arp Schnitger among others.  The church and organ are filmed extensively in the documentary Martinikerk Rondeau.

Gallery

Photo gallery entrances.

References

External links 

  Martinikerk, official website

Religious buildings and structures completed in 1482
Buildings and structures completed in 1482
Towers completed in the 15th century
Buildings and structures in Groningen (city)
Churches in Groningen (province)
Rijksmonuments in Groningen (province)
Gothic architecture in the Netherlands
13th-century churches in the Netherlands